Monster by Mistake is a Canadian CGI-animated series that aired on YTV from September 18, 1999 to March 23, 2003 after airing its pilot in 1996. The series was created by Mark Mayerson of Catapult Productions, and co-produced with CCI Entertainment (formerly Cambium) in Toronto, Canada. The two companies partnered in Studio 345, a computer animation and former Sears catalogue production facility for the production of the show, which was made using Houdini software. It was one of the earliest TV shows to be entirely computer animated.

Characters 
 Warren Patterson (voiced by Julie Lemieux in the series and voiced by Corey Sevier in the pilot episode) is the protagonist of the show, who turns into the titular blue sasquatch-like monster whenever he sneezes after having been accidentally cursed by Gorgool's jewel.
 Tracy Patterson (voiced by Hillary Goldhar) is Warren's supportive older sister who practices witchcraft after receiving Gorgool's book.
 Johnny B. Dead (voiced by William Colgate) is a wise-cracking, trumpet-playing ghost who assists the siblings in their misadventures and secretly lives in the Pattersons' attic.

Recurring characters 
 Roz and Tom Patterson (voiced by Sally Cahill and Tony Rosato) are the parents of Warren and Tracy.
 Aunt Dolores (voiced by Jayne Eastwood) is Warren and Tracy's aunt, a crabby and stuck-up but serious and well-meaning police officer and the older sister of Tom Patterson. She has a vendetta against the monster, unaware of it being her nephew.
 Billy Castleman (voiced by Daniel DeSanto) is an overweight, mean school bully who often ridicules Warren. He's hellbent on proving Warren as the monster, but is unable to do so.
 Gorgool (voiced by Len Carlson) is a sorcerer and the would-be ruler of Fenrath, who is trapped in a ball. He intends to steal the Jewel of Fenrath and the Book of Spells with his servant.
 The Servant (voiced by Howard Jerome) is the dim-witted servant of Gorgool. He carries Gorgool around and follows Gorgool's every command.  His real name is never mentioned.
 Wesley Whiffington III (voiced by Christopher Ralph) is a child who appears in Season Two. He is spoiled and never gets things his way. He is also interested in adult projects such as business and moviemaking.
 Miranda Bell (voiced by Alyson Court) is a girl who said she became a scientist at age six and says that her brain weighs eight pounds.
 Morgool (voiced by Len Carlson) is Gorgool's twin brother and the ruler of Fenrath. He is not trapped within a ball and is far more dangerous and evil than his twin. It is believed that Morgool is unable to control anyone who is superior to him, such as the monster, and his jealousy and greed for the throne resulted in Gorgool's confinement to the glass ball.
 Ms. Gish (voiced by Barbara Franklin) is the teacher who is involved with most episodes in Season One.
 Kragon (voiced by George Buza) is a guard working for Morgool in Fenrath. He always helps his master in his schemes, mainly trying to capture the monster. Kragon's home region is Gorem Range.
 Red (voiced by Megan Fahlenbock) is an orphan from Fenrath who becomes friends with Warren and Tracy. She is always up for adventure and kicking bad-guy butt.
 Freddie Mitchell and Corum (both voiced by Susan Roman) are friends of Warren's. Freddie loves to tell jokes and play soccer. Connor's hobbies include pogo jumping, playing the piano, and video games.
 Keebo (voiced by Hadley Kay) is a shapeshifting creature from Fenrath.

Episodes
The first episode aired on October 26, 1996, and the last episode aired on March 23, 2003. To date, 52 episodes have been produced in three seasons.

Pilot (1996)

Season 1 (1999)

Season 2 (2000)

Season 3 (2003)

Notes 
 Prior to the series being made, the pilot episode aired as a yearly Halloween special from 1996 to 1999.

Home media

Several episodes of the series have been released by Genius Products on DVD, with each containing two episodes:
 Disc one: "Monster on Purpose" and "Monster by Mistake" (titled as "The Jewel of Fenrath")
 Disc two: "Badgering Billy" and "Haunted House"
 Disc three: "Sasquashed" and "Campsite Creeper"

Several VHS tapes of the series were released by Winding Stair Press in 2000:
 "Monster By Mistake" and "Entertaining Orville"
 "Home Alone" and "Monster a Go-Go"
 "Fossil Remains" and "Kidnapped"
 "Gorgool's Pet" and "Jungleland"

References

External links
 
 http://www.tv.com/shows/monster-by-mistake/
 https://web.archive.org/web/20151105184149/http://www.catapultproductions.com/Behind/index.html
 http://www.behindthevoiceactors.com/tv-shows/Monster-by-Mistake

YTV (Canadian TV channel) original programming
Canadian children's animated fantasy television series
Television shows filmed in Toronto
1990s Canadian animated television series
2000s Canadian animated television series
1996 Canadian television series debuts
2003 Canadian television series endings
Canadian computer-animated television series
English-language television shows
Animated television series about children
Animated television series about monsters